Robot Gully is a gully at c.3675 m on the northwest side of the summit crater of Mount Erebus, Ross Island. The feature was used as the access route from a NASA robot called Dante that was carried to the crater rim, January 1, 1993.
 

Valleys of the Ross Dependency
Landforms of Ross Island